

Background
Andhra Pradesh has had a turbulent last few years in politics with the movement for a separate Telangana gathering steam and the death of former Chief Minister Y. S. Rajasekhara Reddy in a helicopter crash. Due to differences with the ruling INC, Reddy's son, Y. S. Jaganmohan Reddy, then broke away to form the YSRCP and was joined by several MLAs. Eighteen MLAs were later disqualified, while Nellore's MP resigned. The Vidhan Sabha seat for Tirupati had also been vacant since 2010 when Chiranjeevi, whose PRP merged with the INC, was elected to the Rajya Sabha.

Campaign
Campaigning for the elections stopped on 10 June at 17:00. At that time, the Election Commission mandated non-locals to leave the constituencies going to the polls. Andhra Pradesh Chief Electoral Officer Bhanwarlal directed the police to search all hotels, lodges, guest houses, function halls and residential schools to enforce the rule. The commission also barred the distribution of voter slips by political parties, the sending of bulk SMSes and the publication or broadcast of opinion or exit polls. During the campaign the police also seized a record Rs. 400 million in cash and other valuables.

Y. Jaganmohan Reddy had been arrested and jailed by the Central Bureau of Investigation on 27 May for having "illegal assets" during the campaign process. His mother Y. S. Vijayamma and sister Sharmila accused both the INC and TDP for having targeted Y. Jaganmohan Reddy. Y. S. Vijayamma also pointed at the INC over a conspiracy in regards to her husband's death in 2009. This followed both mother and son having left the INC and resigned from their Pulivendula assembly and Kadapa Lok Sabha seat. In the ensuing by-election in 2011, both of them held on to their seats with large margins of victory.

Other campaigning during the elections was undertaken by INC MP Chiranjeevi in Nellore. YSRCP's Honorary President Y. S. Vijayamma and her daughter, Sharmila, as well as TDP President N. Chandrababu Naidu, campaigned in Tirupati. The incumbent Chief Minister N. Kiran Kumar Reddy and the leader of the Andhra Pradesh Congress Committee Botsa Satyanarayana also campaigned during the last 10 days. The INC's federal ministers, Vayalar Ravi and Ghulam Nabi Azad, along with most of the Andhra Pradesh cabinet, also campaigned for the party. The BJP MP Sushma Swaraj spoke at the only electoral rally in Parkala with the promise of creating a separate Telangana; the TRS' leader K. Chandrasekhara Rao also campaigned in the constituency.

Results
Note : PRP MLA's Will Be Counted As INC MLA's Because The Party Has Merged With Indian National Congress

The March result was announced under tight security by Bhanwarlal on 18 March. For the first time it involved the use of 3G technology to upload data to the internet more quickly, with the counting process recorded with web cameras. YSRCP won the Kovur seat after the incumbent TDP MLA resigned.

Vote counting started at 8:00 on 15 June 2012. The Lok Sabha constituency had a turnout of about 70%, while the Vidhan Sabha constituencies had an average of 80% voter turnout. Security was again tightened, with 9,000 police deployed in three layers of security at the 13 counting centres within the 12 districts. The Nellore Lok Sabha seat had 13 candidates, while the 18 Vidhan Sabha seats had a total of 242 candidates. Notably, Ongole had 23 contestants, Tirupati and Rajampet followed with 19 candidates each, while Narasannapet and Polavaram had the least competition with six candidates each.

The incumbent Mekapati Rajamohan Reddy held on to his Nellore seat for the YSRCP with a margin of over 290,000 votes against the second placed Rajyasabha member T. Subbarami Reddy of the INC.

YSRCP got 46.8% of the total votes polled and the INC was reduced to 22% of the total votes got polled.

YSRCP won 15 seats, while the incumbent INC won two seats, taking its legislative majority to 154 out of 294 seats and the Telangana Rashtra Samithi won the Parkala seat, which was the only seat open for election in the Telegana region, after Bhikshapati won the seat. However, YSRCP party leaders P. Subhash Chandra Bose and Konda Surekha, who were former Andhra Pradesh cabinet ministers, lost in Ramachandrapuram and Parkala, respectively. Notable YSRCP winners were: B. Sreenivas Reddy, a relative of the Y. S. Reddy family, Shobha Nagi Reddy, Tellam Balaraju, Kapu Ramachandra Reddy, Gurunath Reddy, Chenna Keshav Reddy, Srikanth Reddy and Dharmana Krishna Das. YSRCP's wins included all the 8 seats in the Rayalseema district, three in the Kadapa district and two in the Anantapur district.

INC won two seats Kothapalli Subbarayudu from Narasapuram
and Thota Trimurthulu from Ramachandrapuram.

Reactions
Y. S. Jaganmohan Reddy's sister, Sharmila, reacted to the victory by suggesting he would be the chief minister by 2014 at the latest. Incumbent INC Chief Minister N. Kiran Kumar Reddy then held a series of emergency meetings with his cabinet and other party MLAs. In contrast to other electoral losses for the INC at the local level, he was not summoned to New Delhi to meet the central party leaders and assess the damage done as a result of having lost most of the 18 seats the party had held before the December defections.

Analysis
The Hindu read this as possibly predictive of the 2014 general election. It also said that while the YSRCP was the favourite, there was a keen eye on who would finish second between the INC and the TDP. Rediff headlined the result as the "fledgling YSR Congress party...has swept the by-elections in Andhra Pradesh, denting the last bastion of Congress in south." It also pointed out that the loss of Tirupati was significant as it was the home district of the INC Chief Minister N. Kiran Kumar Reddy and had previously been won by Chiranjeevi before his resignation to seek a Rajya Sabha seat. The Economic Times referred to the YSRCP's successful result as "riding on the sympathy wave in the wake of its leader Y.S. Jaganmohan Reddy's arrest", and the Hindustan Times had a similar assessment.

References

2012 elections in India
By-elections in India
Elections in Andhra Pradesh
2010s in Andhra Pradesh
March 2012 events in India
June 2012 events in India